The 2020 UEC European Track Championships (under-23 & junior) were the 20th continental championships for European under-23 and junior track cyclists, and the 11th since the event was renamed following the reorganisation of European track cycling in 2010. The event took place at the Velodromo Attilio Pavesi in Fiorenzuola d'Arda, Italy from 8 to 13 October 2020.

Medal summary

Under-23

Junior

Notes
 Competitors named in italics only participated in rounds prior to the final.

Medal table

References

External links
 Results
 European Cycling Union
 Results book

under-23
European Track Championships, 2020
European Track
International cycle races hosted by Italy
European Track Championships (under-23 and junior)
European Track Championships (under-23 and junior)